Varun Agarwal (born 6 December 1986) is an Indian entrepreneur, film maker and author. He has co-founded three companies and authored a national bestseller, How I Braved Anu Aunty and Co-Founded a Million Dollar Company.He founded a company called Alma Matter from scratch which became a million dollars company.

Early life

Brought up in Bangalore, Varun did his schooling from Bishop Cotton Boys' School and studied engineering at CMR Institute of Technology.

Entrepreneur

Varun has co-founded three startups, Alma Mater, an online store for merchandise especially for students of colleges and schools which was started in 2009, Reticular, a social media marketing company started in 2010, and Last minute Films, a production company for online video content which was started in 2005.

Alma Mater

Varun says that the current aim of the company is to become profitable as well as more responsible.

Alma Mater has also launched a customised online Do-It-Yourself (DIY) online T-shirt maker tool called PLAY. The user can join or create a group, make custom T-shirts with an online editing tool, share it with friends and group members and invite others to join.

Mento 
 Varun Agarwal also founded an online e-learning platform name Mento which is also India's first Ed-tech platform for creative courses.

Author

How I Braved Anu Aunty and Co-Founded a Million Dollar Company was rolled out in 2012 by Rupa publishers and is a national bestseller. ‘How I Braved Anu Aunty & Co-founded A Million Dollar Company’ had already hit the number 5 spot on the Amazon India bestsellers list.

Music Video

He has teamed up with a Bangalore-based stand-up comedian Sanjay Manaktala to make a music video called ‘Anu Aunty, Engineering Anthem’ based on his book. This video, which went viral, was featured on The Enthu Cutlets, a channel promoted by Varun in 2014 to showcase Bengaluru's comedians.

The Movie

Siddarth Roy Kapur and Ronnie Screwvala will be making a movie which is an adaptation of Varun's book ‘How I Braved Anu Aunty and Co-founded A Million Dollar Company’. Nitesh Tiwari, who directed the Bollywood movie Dangal, is working on this new film.

Motivational speaker

Varun is one of the prominent storytellers and motivational speakers in India. Varun has also given INK talks, the Indian version of TED, where he shares his story. His first INKTalk's speech has marked more than  views on YouTube and is constantly increasing. He has given talks to executives at Unilever in London, college students in Pune and to employees of tobacco firm Philip Morris in Macau.

References

External links
Book Review: How I Braved Anu Aunty and Co-founded a Million Dollar Company

1987 births
Bishop Cotton Boys' School alumni
Living people
Indian filmmakers